Eastern Oregon University (EOU) (officially designated as Oregon’s Rural University) is a public university in La Grande, Oregon.  It was formerly part of the Oregon University System, since dissolved. EOU was founded in 1929 as a teacher’s college and today serves as a center for education, culture, and scholarship in rural areas of Oregon.

The university offers bachelor's and master's degrees. Most students obtain a B.S. degree, which requires one quarter of science, whereas a B.A. degree requires two years of a foreign language. In 2016, the university also began work to introduce a Bachelor of Applied Science (B.A.S.) degree with a vocational bent.

History
EOU opened its doors in 1929 as Eastern Oregon Normal School, a teacher training school. In 1939, the Oregon Legislature changed the name to Eastern Oregon College of Education. The words "of Education" were dropped from the college's name in 1956. The 1973 Legislature changed EOC's name to Eastern Oregon State College. In 1997, Eastern Oregon State College became Eastern Oregon University. In 2013 the Oregon University System began the process of creating independent boards for certain schools, including Oregon State and the University of Oregon. On June 30, 2015, the Oregon University System was dissolved and on July 1, 2015, the Eastern Oregon University Board of Trustees took on governance of the institution.

Campus setting
EOU's location in La Grande is in the heart of the Blue Mountain range between Portland, Oregon and Boise, Idaho just off Interstate 84. Driving to La Grande takes approximately four hours from Portland, two and half from Boise, five from Seattle, and four from Spokane. As of 2021 EOU has a 98% acceptance rate. 

The campus contains 26 buildings, including three living facilities – Alikut Hall, North Hall, and Daugherty Hall – all of which are co-ed. Inlow Hall, Eastern's administration building, is listed on the National Register of Historic Places.

Academics
Academic programs at Eastern Oregon University offer the opportunity to learn in a small classroom setting in rural Oregon. With four colleges, students can choose from more than 30 academic programs, including sciences, humanities, teaching, and business. New programming in vocational fields such as Fire Services Administration and Global Foods and Agribusiness target regional employment needs.

Academic organization
EOU offers bachelor's degrees and the degrees of MFA, MBA, Master of Education and Master of Arts in Teaching. The university offers business and elementary education programs at a satellite campus in Gresham, Oregon.

The school is composed of the following colleges:
College of Business
College of STM & Health Sciences
College of Arts & Social Sciences
College of Education

In addition, programs in Agriculture, in cooperation with Oregon State University, and the baccalaureate degree in Nursing through the Oregon Health & Sciences University are offered on this campus. Many degrees are available fully online.

Tuition 
EOU’s tuition and fees average thousands less than other public and private institutions in the surrounding region. The Economist recently ranked EOU among the best value colleges in the Northwest for return-on-investment. Additionally, EOU offers in-state tuition for Western Undergraduate Exchange (WUE) residents. Students from the Commonwealth of the Northern Mariana Islands and Guam are eligible for the WUE rate. Transfer students can also receive this benefit. 

EOU has over a hundred scholarships and awards available. The university gives out over $4 million to students every year. 93% of students at EOU receive some form of financial aid. Students who submit admissions applications are automatically considered for the following scholarships: 

 University Achievement Award – Awards up to $1250
 University Scholar Award  – Awards up to $3,000
 University Scholarly Need Award  – Awards up to $1,500
 EOU 4-County Housing Award  – Awards up to $500

To receive EOU Awards or EOU Foundation Scholarships students must have a current FAFSA on file.

Faculty
EOU employs over one hundred full-time faculty. They are organized under the Associated Academic Professionals (AAP) Local 6200.

Accreditation
EOU is accredited by the Northwest Commission on Colleges and Universities, The International Assembly for Collegiate Business Education IACBE, and the National Council for Accreditation of Teacher Education.

Athletics
The Eastern Oregon athletic teams are called the Mountaineers. The university is a member of the National Association of Intercollegiate Athletics (NAIA), primarily competing in the Cascade Collegiate Conference (CCC) for most of its sports since the 1993–94 academic year; while its football team competes in the Frontier Conference (but had previously competed as an Independent in the NCAA Division III ranks until the 2004 fall season).

Eastern Oregon competes in 15 intercollegiate varsity sports: Men's sports include baseball (2019), basketball, cross country, football, soccer, track & field and volleyball; while women's sports include basketball, cross country, lacrosse (2019), soccer, softball, track & field, volleyball and wrestling.

Football
Eastern Oregon's football team plays at Community Stadium located on campus. The La Grande High School football team also plays their home games there.

Quick facts
Athletic Director: Anji Weissenfluh

Defunct Sports: women's golf, skiing. Some sports have been relegated to club sports such as rodeo and polo.

Notable alumni
Fouad Ajami, Middle East expert and political advisor
Jace Billingsley, NFL football player, Detroit Lions
Rod Chandler, U.S. Representative from the state of Washington
Tyronne Gross, former NFL football player, San Diego Chargers
Mike Kyle, wrestler; current mixed martial artist, once fighting for the UFC
William De Los Santos, Author, Poet, Screenwriter and Motion-Picture Director (enrolled as William Hilbert)
David Panuelo, President of Micronesia
 Aren Palik, Vice President of the Federated States of Micronesia

The oldest graduate
99-year-old Leo Plass received his degree in June 2011, setting a world record. He dropped out less than one semester away from graduation in 1932 when the Great Depression occurred and started a career as a logger. He died in August 2015, shortly after his 104th birthday.

References

External links

 Official website
 Official athletics website

 
1929 establishments in Oregon
Buildings and structures in Union County, Oregon
Cascade Collegiate Conference
Education in Union County, Oregon
Educational institutions established in 1929
La Grande, Oregon
Universities and colleges accredited by the Northwest Commission on Colleges and Universities
Public universities and colleges in Oregon